Bistričica is a settlement in the Municipality of Kamnik in the Upper Carniola region of Slovenia.

Name
Bistričica was attested in written sources as Veustritz in 1323, Fewstricz in 1419, Nabystrziczi in 1426, Wenigen Fewstricz in 1436, and Klain Fewstricz in 1468, among other spellings.

References

External links 
Bistričica on Geopedia

Populated places in the Municipality of Kamnik